is a mountain located in Fukuoka Prefecture, Japan. It is part of the Kyushu Mountains.

References 

Mountains of Fukuoka Prefecture